Arrhenius may refer to
 Birgit Arrhenius (born 1932), Swedish archaeologist
 Carl Axel Arrhenius (1757–1824), Swedish army lieutenant and amateur mineralogist who discovered ytterbite, a mineral that led to the discovery of yttrium by Johan Gadolin
 Niklas Arrhenius, Swedish discus thrower
 Svante Arrhenius (1859–1927), Swedish physical chemist and 1903 Nobel laureate
 Arrhenius definition, Svante Arrhenius definition of acids and bases
 Arrhenius equation, Svante Arrhenius formula for modeling the temperature dependence of reaction rate constants
 Arrhenius plot
 Arrhenius (lunar crater), named for Svante Arrhenius
 5697 Arrhenius, main-belt asteroid, named for Svante Arrhenius
 Arrhenius (Martian crater), named for Svante Arrhenius
 Olof Arrhenius (1895–1977), Swedish plant physiologist